This is a list of glaciers in Svalbard. It includes glaciers and ice caps in Svalbard, Norway.

List of glaciers and ice caps

Ice caps

Austfonna
Biscayarfonna
Glitnefonna
Lomonosovfonna
Løvenskioldfonna
Valhallfonna
Vegafonna
Vestfonna

Glaciers

Aavatsmarkbreen
Abrahamsenbreen
Adambreen
Adolfbreen
Akademikarbreen
Aldegondabreen
Angelbreen
Antoniabreen
Arbobreen
Arlabreen
Arneliusbreen
Åsgardfonna
Austgötabreen
Austjøkulen
Bakaninbreen
Balderfonna
Barentsjøkulen
Belopol'skijbreen
Besselsbreen
Bjørlykkebreen
Bjørnbreen
Blomstrandbreen
Borebreen
Bragebreen
Bråsvellbreen
Brazybreen
Buchananisen
Buchanbreen
Bullbreen
Bungebreen
Charlesbreen
Charpentierbreen
Chauveaubreen
Chomjakovbreen
Chydeniusbreen
Comfortlessbreen
Dahlbreen
Deltabreen
Devikbreen
Dollfusbreen
Duckwitzbreen
Dunderdalsbreen
Edgeøyjøkulen
Eidembreen
Elfenbeinbreen
Erdmannbreen
Esmarkbreen
Etonbreen
Fimbulisen
Fjortende Julibreen
Flakbreen
Foldnutfonna
Foxfonna
Fredfonna
Freemanbreen
Fridtjovbreen
Frysjabreen
Gaffelbreen
Garnbreen
Gimlebreen
Glasiologbreen
Gråkallbreen
Gullybreen
Haakenbreen
Hakebreen
Hambergbreen
Hansbreen
Hayesbreen
Hedgehogfonna
Heksebreen
Hellefonna
Hinlopenbreen
Hochstetterbreen
Hollertoppen
Holtedahlfonna
Hornbreen
Hübnerbreen
Huldrebreen
Hydrografbreen
Isachsenfonna
Keilhaubreen
Kennedybreen
Kjerulfbreen
Kongsvegen glacier
Königsbergbreen
Konowbreen
Krøkjebreen
Kronebreen
Krylbreen
Kumulusbreen
Kvalpyntfonna
Kvitbreen
Kvitøyjøkulen
Kvitskarvbreen
Langlibreen
Leighbreen
Liestølbreen
Lilliehöökbreen
Linnébreen
Lisbetbreen
Longstaffbreen
Longyearbreen
Løvliebreen
Løyndbreen
Luitpoldbreen
Lundbreen
Lyngebreen
Makarovbreen
Markhambreen
Martinbreen
Mathewbreen
Mathiasbreen
Mayerbreen
Mefonna
Mendeleevbreen
Miethebreen
Mittag-Lefflerbreen
Monacobreen
Nansenbreen
Nathorstbreen
Negribreen
Norddomen
Nordenskiöldbreen
Nordmannsfonna
Olav V Land
Olsokbreen
Osbornebreen
Øydebreen
Palanderisen
Passfjellbreen
Paulabreen
Paulbreen
Paxbreen
Penckbreen
Petersbreen
Presidentbreen
Rabotbreen
Ramondbreen
Randbreen
Raudfjordbreen
Recherchebreen
Renardbreen
Richterbreen
Rijpbreen
Rosenthalbreen
Rundisen
Sagtindbreen
Samarinbreen
Scheelebreen
Scheibreen
Scottbreen
Sefströmbreen
Seligerbreen
Serlabreen
Sjettebreen
Skarpegbreen
Skilfonna
Skonrokkbreen
Skruisbreen
Smeerenburgbreen
Snödombreen
Snøkuvbreen
Sørdomen
Sørkappfonna
St. Nikolausbreen
Stallobreen
Steenstrupbreen
Steindolpbreen
Stonebreen
Storbreen
Storøyjøkulen
Svalbreen
Svalisbreen
Sveabreen
Sveigbreen
Svitjodbreen
Sykorabreen
Sysselmannbreen
Tavlebreen
Tessinbreen
Tinayrebreen
Torellbreen
Torsfonna
Tromsøbreen
Tunabreen
Tverrbreen
Ulvebreen
Usherbreen
Uvêrsbreen
Valettebreen
Varderyggfonna
Vasil'evbreen
Vegardbreen
Venernbreen
Vestgötabreen
Vestjøkulen
Veteranen
Vintervegen
Vitkovskijbreen
Von Postbreen
Vonbreen
Waggonwaybreen
Wahlenbergbreen
Willybreen
Winsnesbreen

See also
List of glaciers in Europe
List of glaciers in Norway

References

External links

 
Svalbard